This is a list of institutions of higher education in Goa:

Universities

Autonomous institutes 
Birla Institute of Technology and Science, Pilani – Goa Campus
Indian Institute of Technology Goa
National Institute of Technology Goa
Goa Institute of Management

General Education Colleges under Goa University
Carmel College for Women
Carmel College for Women is an institute of higher education Nuvem, Goa, India. The college was established in 1964. It is the first college for women in Goa. The college is run by the nuns of the Carmel Congregation. The college began with the departments of Arts and Science and then expanded to Department of Commerce in 1987. The college offers undergraduate degree in arts, science and commerce. It also offers a master's degree in commerce and master's degree in psychology. The college has as a Grade "A" by NAAC. The current principal of the college is Dr. Sr. Aradhana A.C
Cuncolim Educational Society's College of Arts & Commerce
Cuncolim Educational Society's College of Arts and Commerce is a college based in Cuncolim, Goa. The college was established in 1987–88. The college offers undergraduate degrees in Arts and Commerce stream.
Dempo Charities Trust Dhempe College of Arts & Science
Dempo College of Arts and Science is based in Miramar, Goa. The college was established in 1962. It has been accredited with grade "A". The college offers undergraduate courses in Science and Arts stream.
Dempo Charities Trust's S.S. Dempo College of Commerce & Economics
S.S Dempo College of Commerce and Economics is based in Panjim, Goa. The institute was established in 1966. The college offers undergraduate and Post graduate degree in Commerce. (B.Com. and M.Com.)
Diocesan Society of Education’s Rosary College of Commerce & Arts
Rosary College of Commerce and Arts was established in June 1990. The college offers undergraduate degrees in commerce, arts and computer applications and a master's degree in commerce. 
Dnyan Prabodhini Mandal's Shree Mallikarjun and Shri Chetan Manju Desai College
Dnyanprassarak Mandal’s College, Assagao, Goa
Dnyanvardhini Divyang Training College
Fr. Agnel College of Arts & Commerce
Goa College of Home Science
Goa College of Hospitality & Culinary Education
Goa Salesian Society's Don Bosco College
Goa Vidyaprasarak Mandal's Gopal Govind Poy Raiturcar College of Commerce & Economics
Government College of Arts, Science and Commerce, Khandola
Government College of Arts, Science & Commerce, Quepem
Government College of Arts, Science & Commerce, Sanquelim
Government College of Commerce & Economics, Borda-Margao
Kamaxi College of Culinary Arts
Mandre College of Commerce, Economics and Management
MES College
Parvatibai Chowgule College
Ponda Education Society's Shri Ravi S. Naik College of Arts & Science
Sant Sohirobanath Ambiye Govt. College of Arts & Commerce, Pernem
Saraswat Vidyalaya's Sridora Caculo College of Commerce & Management Studies
Sateri Pisani Education Society’s Gopal Gaonkar Memorial Goa Multi-Faculty College
St. Joseph Vaz Educational Society's St. Joseph Vaz College, Cortalim-Goa
St. Joseph Vaz Educational Society is a sister concern of the Diocesan Society of Education, the largest Educational Society running over 100 educational institutions in the State of Goa and providing quality education to the students enrolled in its institutions.
St. Joseph Vaz Educational Society, having realised the need of opening an Institution of Higher Education, decided to establish a College of Science named St. Joseph Vaz College to perpetuate the memory of the first Goan Saint for posterity. The College, located in Cortalim, is running an undergraduate course in Science faculty.
The College is affiliated to Goa University and recognised by Government of Goa. St. Joseph Vaz College will always attempt to provide a platform for young minds to enhance their knowledge and skills and thereby contribute to the growth of education in the State and Country.
St. Xavier's College, Mapusa, Goa
Swami Brahmanand Mahavidyalayam
Swami Vivekanand Vidyaprasarak Mandal's College of Commerce
Vidya Prabodhini College of Commerce, Education, Computer & Management
Vidya Vikas Mandal's Shree Damodar College of Commerce & Economics
Zantye Brothers Educational Foundation's Narayan Zantye College of Commerce

Professional colleges under Goa University
Agnel Institute of Technology and Design
Bharateeya Sanskriti Prabodhini's Gomantak Ayurveda Mahavidyalaya & Research Centre
Devi Sharvani Education Society's V. M. Salgaocar College of Law
Don Bosco College of Agriculture
Don Bosco College of Engineering
Ganpat Parsekar College of Education
Goa College of Architecture
Goa College of Art
Goa Engineering College
Goa College of Music
Goa College of Pharmacy
Goa Dental College
Goa Medical College
Goa Vidyaprasarak Mandal’s Dr. Dada Vaidya College of Education
Institute of Nursing Education
Institute of Psychiatry and Human Behaviour
J.D. Institute of Fashion Technology
Kala Academy's College of Theatre Arts
National Institute of Hydrography
Nirmala Institute of Education
Padre Conceição College of Engineering
Ponda Education Society's Rajaram & Tarabai Bandekar College of Pharmacy
Ponda Education Society’s College of Education
Ramanatha Crisna Pai Raikar School of Agriculture
Shri Kamaxshi Devi Homeopathic Medical College & Hospital
Shree Rayeshwar Institute of Engineering and Information Technology
V.M. Salgaocar Institute of International Hospitality Education
Vidya Prabodhini College of Commerce, Education, Computer & Management
Vidya Vikas Mandal's Govind Ramnath Kare College of Law
Vrundavan Institute of Nursing Education

Institutes recognized by Goa University
Council of Scientific and Industrial Research - National Institute of Oceanography, Dona Paula
Directorate of Archives and Archaeology, Government of Goa, Panaji
Fishery Survey of India, Mormugao
Indian Council of Agricultural Research - Central Coastal Agricultural Research Institute, Old Goa
Indian Council of Medical Research - National Institute of Malaria Research, Panaji
 National Centre for Polar and Ocean Research, Vasco da Gama
Syngenta Biosciences Pvt. Ltd., Corlim
Thomas Stephens Konknni Kendr, Alto Porvorim
Xavier Centre of Historical Research, Alto Porvorim

References 

Goa
Education
Education in Goa